The Landwind X8 is a mid-size SUV produced by Chinese automaker Jiangling Motor Holding, a joint venture between Aiways, Changan Auto and Jiangling Motors Corporation Group (JMCG).

Overview
The Landwind X8 debuted during the 2009 Shanghai Auto Show in April 2009, and went on sale in the second half of 2009. The Landwind X8 SUV has a body-on-frame structure and rear-wheel-drive layout for its off-road capabilities.

Pricing of the Landwind X8 starts from around 150,000 for the 4×2 variant and around 160,000 for the 4×4.

Specifications
At launch, the Landwind X8 is powered by a common-rail turbo diesel sourced from VM Motori from Italy, developing 140HP and 350Nm of torque and a 2.4-liter 4-cylinder gasoline engine sourced from Mitsubishi, developing 150HP. The engines meet the China IV emission standard. 

As of 2012, an update introduced the Landwind X8 with a 2.0 liter petrol engine, a 2.4 liter petrol engine, and a 2.5 liter turbo petrol engine. A 2.0 liter turbo diesel engine was added in 2012 producing 140hp and 340nm. The Landwind X8 has a 6-speed automatic gearbox and is working on an 8-speed automatic gearbox for the X8.

As of 2018, there are 8 variants of Landwind X8 available, with 2 engine options including the 1.8-litre turbo engine and 2.0-litre turbo engine, with both engines mated to a manual transmission. The maximum engine power is 130.0kW, maximum horsepower is 177PS, and maximum torque is 320.0N·m.

References

External links

Official website

Landwind vehicles
Cars of China
Mid-size sport utility vehicles
2010s cars